Patricia Parsons (June 9, 1931 – October 26, 2006) was an American character actress who appeared in about a dozen films beginning in 1937. She was sometimes credited as Patsy Lee Parsons.

Biography
Parsons's appearance in a benefit show at Madison Square Garden led to a contract with RKO Pictures. She began acting at age 6, and mostly did child roles, notably in Yankee Doodle Dandy (1942). But she is perhaps best remembered for one of her few adult roles, as the evil space tyrant "Cleolanta" on the TV show Rocky Jones, Space Ranger in 1954.

Like many former child stars, Parsons had difficulty finding good adult roles. She retired shortly after leaving Rocky Jones, Space Ranger, making one last TV appearance on Science Fiction Theater in 1956. She was still only in her mid-20s when she stopped acting.

Parsons had a busy post-entertainment career in California as the wife of banker and community activist Solon Soteras. As Pat Soteras, she worked at Pepperdine University and raised three children, Alexander, Nickoletta and Anthony. She also wrote a weekly column for the Malibu Times. In her later years, she was most remembered for her work with the Agoura/Oak Park/ Conejo Valley Chamber of Commerce where, as its executive director, she increased membership eightfold.

Legacy
In memory of her work with the chamber, the Patricia Soteras scholarship fund was established.

Selected filmography

References

Sources and External Links
 
 Patsy Parsons at epguides.com
 Patsy Parsons at The Acorn community newspaper
 Crash of Moons movie review
 Space Hero Files: Rocky Jones, Space Ranger
 Descriptions and credits for Rocky Jones, Space Ranger episodes, and one of the few on-line sources to spell "Cleolanthe" correctly
 Database and cover gallery of Rocky Jones, Space Ranger comics at comics.org

American film actresses
American television actresses
20th-century American actresses
1931 births
2006 deaths
American child actresses
Actresses from West Virginia
21st-century American women